SM UC-60 was a German Type UC II minelaying submarine or U-boat in the German Imperial Navy during World War I. The U-boat was ordered on 12 January 1916, laid down on 31 March 1916, and was launched on 8 November 1916. She was commissioned into the German Imperial Navy on 25 June 1917 as SM UC-60. In one patrols UC-60 was credited with sinking one ship, either by torpedo or by mines laid. UC-60 was surrendered on 23 February 1919 and was broken up at Rainham in 1921.

Design
A German Type UC II submarine, UC-60 had a displacement of  when at the surface and  while submerged. The submarine was powered by two six-cylinder four-stroke diesel engines each producing  (a total of ), two electric motors producing , and two propeller shafts.

UC-60 was fitted with six  mine tubes, eighteen UC 200 mines, three  torpedo tubes (one on the stern and two on the bow), seven torpedoes, and one  Uk L/30 deck gun. Her complement was twenty-six crew members.

Summary of raiding history

References

Notes

Citations

Bibliography

 
 

Ships built in Danzig
German Type UC II submarines
U-boats commissioned in 1917
World War I minelayers of Germany
World War I submarines of Germany
1916 ships